9 meter is a 2013 17-minute-long Danish live-action short film written and directed by Anders Walter. The film premiered at the Scandinavian Film Festival in Los Angeles on January 12, 2013. In 2012 the film was Oscar short-listed.

Plot

16-year old Daniel is an athlete with a talent for long jumping. He has broken his own records many times. Unfortunately, his mother is in a coma and on the verge of dying. Daniel has the impression that as long as he breaks his own records, she stays alive. When he fails to do so, her condition coincidentally gets worse. Daniel blames himself and starts to jump between rooftops to get the extra kick needed to push himself to new limits and hopefully keep the doctors from shutting off her life support.

References

External links

Danish short films
2013 films
Danish teen drama films
Athletics films
Medical-themed films
2010s teen drama films
2013 drama films
2010s Danish-language films